Trapeza  ("τράπεζα")  is a Greek word meaning table or stand, which in Greek can mean a bank or money-changer. It may refer to: 

 Trapeza, Achaea, a village in Diakopto, Achaea, Greece
 Trapeza, Crete, a Minoan site
 Trapeza, Cyprus a village in Northern Cyprus
 In Eastern Orthodox monasteries, the refectory

See also
 Trapeze (disambiguation)